The government of the German-speaking Community (DG-Regierung) is the executive body of the German-speaking Community of Belgium, located in the east of the  province of Liège. The members are chosen by the Parliament of the German-speaking Community.

Compositions

Compositions 2019–2024

Compositions 2014–2019

Compositions 2009–2014

Compositions 2004–2009

1984 establishments in Belgium
Politics of the German-speaking Community of Belgium
Government of Belgium